Marine Current Turbines Ltd (MCT), is a United Kingdom-based company which is developing tidal stream generators. It is owned by the German automation company, Siemens.

History 
MCT was founded in 2000 to develop ideas of tidal power developed by Peter Fraenkel, who had previously been a founder partner of IT Power, a consultancy established to further the development of sustainable energy technologies. The company is based in Bristol and employed 15 people in 2007.

They now have contracts to install a full tidal farm in the Skerries, off northwest Wales, and projects in the Bay of Fundy, Nova Scotia and Vancouver, British Columbia, Canada.

In February 2012, Siemens acquired a majority share in the company, raising its holding from 45% to over 90%. MCT was wholly owned by Siemens, as part of the Hydro and Ocean Business, before being transferred to the Renewables business and finally divested to Atlantis resources who effectively shut the company down.

Technology

The technology developed by MCT works much the same as a submerged windmill, driven by the flow of water rather than air. Tidal flows are more predictable than air flows both in time and maximum velocity, therefore, it is possible to bring designs closer to the theoretical maximum. The turbines have a patented feature by which they can take advantage of the reversal of flow every 6 hours and generate on both flow and ebb of the tide. The tips of the blades are placed well below the surface so they will not be a danger to shipping or be vulnerable to storms.

Because the blades move relatively slowly (15 rpm) and there are only two, it is unlikely that there will be adverse environmental impacts on fish or other aquatic life. A monitoring project has been set up in the Strangford Lough project to confirm this.

In shallow waters, the turbines are suspended on a tower which extends above the water surface and enables the turbines to be lifted clear off the water for maintenance purposes. But since the number of sites around the world where this is possible is finite, they're also developing fully submersed systems which will take advantage of larger scale, but will also be able to be brought to the surface for maintenance.

SeaFlow

The SeaFlow project involved building a full-size prototype capable of producing 300 kW. This was installed off the Devon coast near Lynmouth in May 2003. It was the largest tidal turbine operating until SeaGen started.

SeaGen

SeaGen was a full-scale tidal flow power station that produced electricity on 14 July 2008.
However, subsequently a computer problem caused damage to one of the rotors and procuring a replacement took until the end of October 2008. However, SeaGen was able to operate using just its good rotor through the summer of 2008 and that rotor was operated at full rated power of 600 kW for many hours.  After replacement of the damaged rotor SeaGen delivered its full rated power of 1.2MW for the first time on 18 December 2008 - believed to be the first time a "wet renewable energy system" has delivered in excess of 1MW.

Skerries Tidal Stream Array
In a proposed joint project with RWE Npower Renewables, 7 of the SeaGen generators, producing about 10MW at peak, would be installed off the Skerries, a patch of very fast-moving water off Anglesey in northwest Wales. An environmental consent application was submitted to the Welsh Government in March 2011, though financing still needs to be finalized.

Canada
An agreement has been made with Canada's Maritime Tidal Energy Corporation in 2007 to develop tidal resources in the Bay of Fundy. MTEC concluded that MCT had the most proven technology of the companies evaluated.

On the west coast, they have also agreed to install at least three 1.2 MW turbines in the Campbell River in British Columbia as a first step in developing tidal farms in that river and other tidal waters.

See also
Tidal Power
 npower UK

Notes

External links
MCT Website

 

Technology companies of the United Kingdom
Tidal power companies of the United Kingdom
Companies based in Bristol